Miss Saint Pierre and Miquelon is a French beauty pageant which selects a representative for the Miss France national competition from the overseas collectivity of Saint Pierre and Miquelon. The first titleholder was crowned in 1984, although the pageant was not organized regularly until 2008. Beginning in 2011, the competition became organized on a biennial basis, although a new titleholder has not been crowned since 2017.

The most recent Miss Saint Pierre and Miquelon is Héloïse Urtizbéréa, who was crowned Miss Saint Pierre and Miquelon 2017 on 8 July 2017. No Miss Saint Pierre and Miquelon titleholders have gone on to win Miss France.

Results summary
No Miss Saint Pierre and Miquelon titleholders have reached the semifinals of Miss France.

Titleholders

Notes

References

External links

Miss France regional pageants
Beauty pageants in France